Michael Andrew Gove (born Graeme Andrew Logan, 26 August 1967) is a British politician serving as Secretary of State for Levelling Up, Housing and Communities and Minister for Intergovernmental Relations since 2021. He has been Member of Parliament (MP) for Surrey Heath since 2005. A member of the Conservative Party, he has served in various Cabinet positions under Prime Ministers David Cameron, Theresa May, Boris Johnson and Rishi Sunak. Gove has twice run to become Leader of the Conservative Party, in 2016 and 2019, finishing in third place on both occasions.

Born in Aberdeen, Gove was in care until being adopted aged four months old, after which he was raised in the Kittybrewster area of the city. He attended the independent Robert Gordon's College and studied English at Lady Margaret Hall, Oxford. He then began a career as a journalist at The Press and Journal before having a long tenure as a leader writer at The Times. Elected for Surrey Heath at the 2005 general election, he was appointed to the Shadow Cabinet by Cameron in 2007 as Shadow Secretary of State for Children, Schools and Families.

Appointed Secretary of State for Education in the Cameron–Clegg coalition, Gove terminated the previous Labour government's Building Schools for the Future programme, reformed A-Level and GCSE qualifications in favour of final examinations, and responded to the Trojan Horse scandal. The National Association of Head Teachers, the Association of Teachers and Lecturers, the National Union of Teachers and the NASUWT passed motions of no confidence in his policies at their conferences in 2013. In the 2014 cabinet reshuffle he was moved to the post of chief whip. Following the 2015 general election and the formation of the majority Cameron government, Gove was promoted to Secretary of State for Justice and Lord Chancellor. As the co-convenor of Vote Leave, Gove was seen, along with Johnson, a fellow Conservative MP, as one of the most prominent figures of the 2016 referendum on EU membership. He was campaign manager for Johnson in the 2016 Conservative Party leadership election but withdrew his support on the morning Johnson was due to declare and announced his own candidacy, finishing third behind May and Andrea Leadsom.

Following May's appointment as Prime Minister, Gove was dismissed from the Cabinet but was appointed to the second May government as Secretary of State for Environment, Food and Rural Affairs following the 2017 general election. He launched a second Conservative leadership bid in 2019, coming third behind Johnson and Jeremy Hunt. Upon appointment of Johnson as Prime Minister, Gove was appointed Chancellor of the Duchy of Lancaster, with responsibilities including preparations for a no-deal Brexit. He took on the additional role of minister for the Cabinet Office in the 2020 cabinet reshuffle. After the 2021 cabinet reshuffle he served as Secretary of State for Levelling Up, Housing and Communities and Minister for Intergovernmental Relations until Gove told Johnson to resign during the July 2022 Government crisis and was dismissed by Johnson. Under Rishi Sunak, Gove was reinstated to his previous roles of Secretary of State for Levelling Up, Housing and Communities and Minister for Intergovernmental Relations.

Early life
Gove was born as Graeme Andrew Logan on 26 August 1967. His biological mother, whom he originally believed to have been an unmarried Edinburgh student, was in fact a 23-year-old cookery demonstrator. Gove regarded his birthplace as Edinburgh until it was revealed in a biography in 2019 that he was born in a maternity hospital in Fonthill Road, Aberdeen. Logan was put into care soon after he was born. At the age of four months he was adopted by a Labour-supporting couple in Aberdeen, Ernest Gove (died 2023) and Christine Gove, by whom he was brought up. After he joined the Gove family, Logan's name was changed to Michael Andrew Gove. His father, Ernest, ran a fish processing business and his mother, Christine, was a lab assistant at the University of Aberdeen, before working at the Aberdeen School for the Deaf.

Gove, his parents, and his adoptive sister Angela Christine lived in a small property in the Kittybrewster area of Aberdeen, before relocating to Rosehill Drive. He was educated at two state schools (Sunnybank Primary School and Kittybrewster Primary School), and later, on the recommendation of his primary school teacher, he sat and passed the entrance exam for the independent Robert Gordon's College. In October 2012, he wrote an apology letter to his former French teacher for misbehaving in class. Gove joined the Labour Party in 1983 and campaigned on behalf of the party for the 1983 general election. Outside of school, he spent time as a Sunday school teacher at Causewayend Church. As he entered sixth year he had to apply for a scholarship as his family fell on difficult economic circumstances. He passed the scholarship exam and served as a school prefect in his final two years.

From 1985 to 1988 he read English at Lady Margaret Hall, Oxford, during which time he joined the Conservative Party. He became a member of the Oxford University Conservative Association and was secretary of Aberdeen South Young Conservatives. He helped write speeches for Cabinet and Shadow Cabinet ministers, including Peter Lilley and Michael Howard. During his first year, he met future Prime Minister Boris Johnson and ran his campaign to be President of the Oxford Union. In an interview with Andrew Gimson, Gove remarked that at Oxford, Johnson was "quite the most brilliant extempore speaker of his generation". Gove was elected as Oxford Union President a year after Johnson. He graduated with an upper second.

After university, when applying for a job at the Conservative Research Department, he was told he was "insufficiently political" and "insufficiently Conservative", so he turned to journalism.

Journalistic career
Gove first found employment on the Peterborough column of The Daily Telegraph, after passing an interview with Max Hastings. Struggling to maintain his career in London, he moved back to Aberdeen and became a trainee reporter at The Press and Journal, where he spent several months on strike in the 1989–1990 dispute over union recognition and representation. From 1990 to 1991, he worked as a reporter for Scottish Television, with a brief interlude at Grampian Television in Aberdeen.

After moving to national television in 1991, Gove worked for the BBC's On the Record, and the Channel 4 current affairs programme A Stab in the Dark, alongside David Baddiel and Tracey MacLeod. In 1994 he began working for the BBC's Today programme.  In 1995 he was identified by The Guardian as part of a group of "a new breed of 21st-century Tories". He broke the news of the 1995 Conservative Party leadership election thanks to his connections with the upper echelons of the party.

He joined The Times in 1996 as a leader writer and assumed posts as its comment editor, news editor, Saturday editor and assistant editor. He has also written a weekly column on politics and current affairs for the newspaper and contributed to The Times Literary Supplement, Prospect magazine and The Spectator. He remains on good terms with Rupert Murdoch, whom Gove described in evidence before the Leveson Inquiry as "one of the most impressive and significant figures of the last 50 years". He wrote a sympathetic biography of Michael Portillo and a highly critical study of the Northern Ireland peace process (The Price of Peace), where he compared the Good Friday Agreement to appeasement of the Nazis in the 1930s.

He was a regular panellist on BBC Radio 4's The Moral Maze and Newsnight Review on BBC Two.

Political career

Gove was the founding chairman of Policy Exchange, a conservative think tank launched in 2002. He was involved in founding the right-leaning magazine Standpoint, to which he occasionally contributed.

Early parliamentary career (2005–2010)

Gove won the Conservative candidacy for Surrey Heath on 5 July 2004, after the sitting MP Nick Hawkins was deselected by the local Conservative association. He first entered the House of Commons after being elected in the 2005 general election. In 2005 he was appointed Shadow Minister for Housing and Planning. He made his maiden speech on 7 June 2005, focusing on national security. Gove was seen as part of an influential set of Conservatives referred to as the Notting Hill Set, which included Conservative leader David Cameron, future Chancellor of the Exchequer George Osborne, Ed Vaizey, Nick Boles and Rachel Whetstone.

Over a five-month period between December 2005 and April 2006, Gove claimed more than £7,000 on a house bought with his wife Sarah Vine, in 2002. Around a third of the money was spent at OKA, an upmarket interior design company established by Viscountess Astor, Cameron's mother-in-law. Shortly afterwards he reportedly 'flipped' his designated second home, a property for which he claimed around £13,000 to cover stamp duty. Gove also claimed for a cot mattress, despite children's items being banned under updated Commons rules. Gove said he would repay the claim for the cot mattress, but maintained that his other claims were "below the acceptable threshold costs for furniture" and that moving house was necessary "to effectively discharge my parliamentary duties". While he was moving between homes, on one occasion he stayed at the Pennyhill Park Hotel in Bagshot, Surrey, following a constituency engagement, charging the taxpayer more than £500 per night's stay.

On 2 July 2007, Gove was promoted to the Shadow Cabinet as Shadow Secretary of State for Children, Schools and Families (a newly created department set up by Gordon Brown), shadowing Ed Balls. In the role he advocated the introduction of a Swedish-style education voucher system, whereby parents would choose where their child would be educated, with the state paying what they would have cost in a state school. He also advocated Swedish-style free schools, to be managed by parents and funded by the state, with the possibility that such schools would be allowed to be run on a for-profit model. Prior to the 2010 general election, most of Gove's questions in Commons debates concerned children, schools and families, education, local government, Council Tax, foreign affairs and the environment.

Secretary of State for Education (2010–2014)

With the formation of the Conservative-Liberal Democrat coalition government following the hung parliament after the 2010 general election, Gove became Secretary of State for Education. His first moves included reorganising his department, announcing plans to allow schools rated as Outstanding by Ofsted to become academies, and cutting the previous government's school-building programme. He apologised, however, when the list of terminated school-building projects he had released was found to be inaccurate; the list was reannounced several times before it was finally accurately published.

In July 2010, Gove said that Labour had failed in their attempt to break the link between social class and school achievement despite spending billions of pounds: quoting research, he indicated that by the age of six years, children of low ability from affluent homes were still out-performing brighter children from poorer backgrounds. At a House of Commons Education Select Committee he said that this separation of achievement grew larger throughout pupils' school careers, stating, "In effect, rich thick kids do better than poor clever children when they arrive at school [and] the situation as they go through gets worse".

Gove's second home was not in his constituency, but in Elstead, in the South West Surrey constituency. Gove sold the house and began to commute to his constituency.

During the 2010 Conservative Party Conference, Gove announced that the primary and secondary-school national curricula for England would be restructured, and that study of authors such as Byron, Keats, Jane Austen, Dickens and Thomas Hardy would be reinstated in English lessons as part of a plan to improve children's grasp of English literature and language. Academies were not required to follow the national curriculum, and so weren't affected by the reforms. Children who failed to write coherently and grammatically, or who were weak in spelling, were penalised in the new examinations. Standards in mathematics and science were also strengthened.

In March 2011, Gove was criticised for not understanding the importance of school architecture and accused of having misrepresented the cost. In February 2011, he had told Parliament that one individual had made £1,000,000 in one year when the true figure was £700,000 for five advisers at different times over a four-year period.

During the Cameron–Clegg ministry, Gove was the subject of repeated criticism for alleged attempts to avoid the provisions of the Freedom of Information Act. The criticism surrounded Gove's use of various private email accounts to send emails that allegedly related to his departmental responsibilities. The allegations suggested that Gove and his advisers believed they could avoid their correspondence being subject to freedom of information requests, as they believed that their private email accounts were not subject to the Freedom of Information Act. In September 2011, the Financial Times reported that Gove had used an undisclosed private email account – called "Mrs Blurt" – to discuss government business with advisers. In March 2012 the Information Commissioner ruled that because emails the Financial Times had requested contained public information they could be the subject of a freedom of information request and ordered the information requested by the paper to be disclosed. It was also alleged by the Financial Times that Gove and his advisors had destroyed email correspondence in order to avoid freedom of information requests. The allegation was denied by Gove's department, which stated that deleting email was simply part of good computer housekeeping.

In June 2012, Michael Portillo backed Gove to be a serious contender in a future race for the Conservative Party leadership, though Gove had said in an interview a few months before that "I'm constitutionally incapable of it. There's a special extra quality you need that is indefinable, and I know I don't have it. There's an equanimity, an impermeability and a courage that you need. There are some things in life you know it's better not to try."

Gove was criticised by teachers unions for his attempts to overhaul English education. At the Association of Teachers and Lecturers Annual Conference in March 2013 a motion of no-confidence in Gove was passed. The next month the National Union of Teachers passed a vote of no confidence in Gove at their annual conference and called for his resignation. The National Association of Head Teachers and NASUWT also passed motions of no confidence at their conferences that year.

Chief Whip of the House of Commons (2014–2015)
On 15 July 2014, Gove's four-year stint in charge of the Department for Education came to an end when he was dismissed as Secretary of State for Education and replaced by former Treasury Minister Nicky Morgan in a wide-ranging cabinet reshuffle. Gove was moved to the post of Government chief whip, which was portrayed as a demotion by his detractors; Prime Minister Cameron denied this was the case. Gove told BBC News that he had mixed emotions about starting the new role, saying it was a privilege to become Chief Whip but that leaving the Department for Education was "a wrench".

The position came with a £30,000 pay cut, and a specific media role saw Gove on television and radio "more than a traditional Chief Whip would be". He missed his first House of Commons vote in the new role, as explained by Shadow Commons Leader Angela Eagle; "Gove not only lost his first vote but managed to get stuck in the toilet in the wrong lobby". Gove remained in the post of chief whip until May 2015, when the role was taken over by Mark Harper.

Secretary of State for Justice (2015–2016)

Following the 2015 general election, Cameron promoted Gove as Secretary of State for Justice and Lord Chancellor in his newly formed cabinet. He was praised in December 2015 for scrapping the courts fee introduced by his predecessor, Chris Grayling. The fee had been heavily criticised for, among other things, causing innocent people to plead guilty out of financial concerns. Gove removed the 12-book limit on prison books introduced by Grayling, arguing that books increased literacy and numeracy, skills needed for making prisoners a "potential asset to society". The move, effective from September 2015, was welcomed by Frances Cook of the Howard League for Penal Reform. Gove was also praised for his prominent role in scrapping a British bid for a Saudi prison contract.

Within three months of his taking office, the Criminal Bar Association (CBA) voted to stop taking new work in protest at Gove's insistence that they work for lower fees. The CBA subsequently praised his "courage" in reversing the proposed cuts. On 14 July 2016 Gove was removed from the position of justice secretary by the new prime minister, Theresa May.

European Union membership referendum (2016)

Gove was a prominent figure in the campaign for Britain to leave the EU in the 2016 referendum and described his decision to take that side as "the most difficult decision of my political life". He and his family spent Christmas with the Camerons at Chequers where, according to Craig Oliver, Cameron was under the impression that Gove would support remaining in the EU. Despite this, Gove decided to support the Leave campaign. At the beginning of March 2016, he was appointed co-convenor of Vote Leave, with Labour MP Gisela Stuart, and given responsibility for chairing the campaign committee.

He argued Britain would be "freer, fairer and better off" for leaving, and that "[t]he day after we vote to leave, we hold all the cards and we can choose the path we want." When in an interview it was claimed that there was no expert opinion to support this, Gove remarked that "the people of this country have had enough of experts from organisations with acronyms saying they know what is best and getting it consistently wrong." However, interviewer Faisal Islam interrupted Gove after the word "experts", causing some sources to report that he had made a general statement that "the people... have had enough of experts". In 2021, Louise Richardson, the vice-chancellor of the University of Oxford, said she was "embarrassed" that Gove was an alumnus, on account of these comments.

In his memoir For the Record, Cameron described Gove during this period as "mendacious", adding: "One quality shone through, disloyalty. Disloyalty to me and, later, disloyalty to Boris [Johnson]".

Conservative Party leadership candidate (2016)
After Cameron announced his intention to resign as Prime Minister, with his successor now likely to be in office by September 2016, Gove was not a candidate, having said in the past that he had no interest in becoming Prime Minister. Instead, he was seen as a strong, highly influential supporter of Johnson for that role. In a move that surprised most political analysts, Gove withdrew his support for Johnson on 30 June 2016, hours before the deadline, without any previous notice to Johnson and announced his own candidacy in the leadership election. Subsequently, Johnson declined to run.

The Telegraph opined that Gove's actions in undermining Johnson's leadership aspirations constituted "the most spectacular political assassination in a generation" while The Guardian labelled it as a "Machiavellian move".

Gove said: "I wanted to help build a team behind Boris Johnson so that a politician who argued for leaving the European Union could lead us to a better future. But I have come, reluctantly, to the conclusion that Boris cannot provide the leadership or build the team for the task ahead. I have, therefore, decided to put my name forward for the leadership. I want there to be an open and positive debate about the path the country will now take. Whatever the verdict of that debate I will respect it. In the next few days I will lay out my plan for the United Kingdom which I hope can provide unity and change."

By 5 July 2016, Gove was in third place in the leadership election, behind May and Andrea Leadsom; the latter had gained an endorsement from Johnson. Some political analysts predicted that Gove might quit the race if he was unable to beat Leadsom in the first round of voting. Later that day, it was announced that May had won the first round of voting, with support from 165 MPs, while Andrea Leadsom received 66 votes and Gove trailed with 48.  Gove was eliminated in the second ballot after receiving 46 votes, compared to 199 for May and 84 for Leadsom. He subsequently told the media that he was "naturally disappointed" and described his two opponents as "formidable politicians", welcoming the fact that the next PM would be female. He also encouraged a "civilised, inclusive, positive and optimistic debate".

Backbencher (2016–2017)

On 14 July 2016 Gove was dismissed by the prime minister, Theresa May. According to Jon Craig of Sky News, Gove was told to "go and learn about loyalty on the backbenches" in a two-minute meeting with May.

In the aftermath of the EU referendum, Gove was accused by Nick Clegg of being the source of a claim by The Sun that Queen Elizabeth II made comments supportive of Brexit in a private lunch at Windsor Castle. Clegg told a BBC documentary that Gove "obviously communicated it – well, I know he did". Gove declined to deny leaking the Queen's comments. The Sun said it had "multiple sources" and was confident its report was true.

In October 2016 Gove was elected to the Exiting the European Union Select Committee. That month he was re-hired by The Times as a weekly columnist and book reviewer. As well as attending meetings of the newspaper's politics team, Gove was dispatched to the United States to report on campaign rallies in the upcoming presidential election.

In December 2016, Gove defended a Vote Leave claim that an additional £350 million a week could be spent on the NHS when Britain left the EU. Gove said the figure was robust and it was up to the Government to decide how to spend it.

In his capacity as a writer for The Times, Gove gave the first British post-election interview to Donald Trump in January 2017, along with Kai Diekmann from Bild, making him the second British politician to meet Trump as President-elect of the United States after Nigel Farage. Despite preferring Hillary Clinton to Trump as President of the United States, Gove's interview and consequent defence of it was seen by some as praising the President-elect unduly.

Secretary of State for Environment, Food and Rural Affairs (2017–2019)

Following the 2017 general election, Gove was promoted to Secretary of State for Environment, Food and Rural Affairs by May during a reshuffle. Gove said he "was quite surprised" to be asked to join the cabinet after May dismissed him in 2016 after she became Prime Minister.

Following his appointment, Gove announced that a microbead ban would be put into place by the end of 2017. The ban arrived in early 2018. It meant that manufacturers could no longer produce the tiny beads used in cosmetics and care products. Another ban came in June 2018 which stopped shops from selling products that contained the beads. The reasoning behind the ban was to stop the beads harming marine life.

In July 2017, Gove announced that a fuel combustion vehicle ban will be put into place due to air pollution. He said that the ban would take effect by 2040 and end the sales of new fuel combustion cars, trucks, vans, and buses that have petrol and diesel engines in the UK. The ban does not include plug-in hybrid vehicles.

Gove introduced a ban on bee-harming pesticides like neonicotinoids. He was praised by Greenpeace UK executive director John Sauven for his strong stance on issues like bee-harming pesticides, single-use plastic bottles and the future of the internal combustion engine", adding "Gove has defied many people's expectations on the environment".

In October 2017, Gove issued an apology for a joke which compared tough interviews on the Today programme to a sexual encounter with Harvey Weinstein. He was criticised by political opponents who felt allegations of sexual abuse were not a suitable subject for jokes.

Other policies Gove had announced by December 2017 were that CCTV would be used in all slaughterhouses and beavers would be reintroduced into the UK.

Gove faced criticism over the appointment of Ben Goldsmith to the role of non-executive director at the Department for Environment, Food and Rural Affairs as Goldsmith had previously donated cash to Gove's Surrey Heath constituency. Concerns were also raised about the selection process for the job, which was overseen by Sir Ian Cheshire, the chairman of Goldsmith's investment firm, Menhaden Capital Management.

An important aspect of Gove's tenure was the introduction of laws concerning animal welfare. Maximum sentences for the crime of animal cruelty increased, as did protection for animals used by Government services, such as police dogs and horses. One of the "toughest worldwide bans" on ivory trade was also introduced in 2018.

May offered Gove the post of secretary of state for exiting the European Union after Dominic Raab's resignation over the Brexit withdrawal agreement in November 2018. Gove rejected the offer after May told him that there was "no chance" of trying to renegotiate the agreement.

In January 2019, May survived a vote of no confidence in her government, after a "barnstorming" speech from Gove directed towards the Leader of the Labour Party, Jeremy Corbyn. The speech, which gained significant media attention, attacked Corbyn for his foreign policy record, with Tom Rogan of the Washington Examiner describing it as "A tour de force. It was angry but not fanatical, passionate but not somber, and intellectual but simply put".

In March 2019, Gove argued that "we didn't vote to leave without a deal. That wasn't the message of the campaign I helped lead. During that campaign, we said we should do a deal with the EU and be part of the network of free trade deals that covers all Europe, from Iceland to Turkey".

In April 2019, after having a meeting with Extinction Rebellion, Gove said he agreed with the activists that there needed to be a deeper level of public understanding over climate change, but he declined to declare a climate emergency in the United Kingdom. Despite Gove's position, Parliament passed a motion to declare a climate emergency.

In May 2019, Gove introduced the Wild Animals in Circuses Bill, banning the use of wild animals in travelling circuses in England.

Conservative Party leadership candidate (2019)
On 26 May 2019, Gove announced he would stand for the Conservative leadership following May's resignation, becoming the eighth candidate to enter the contest. He promised to remove the charge for UK citizenship applications from EU nationals if elected, and to replace VAT with a "simpler sales tax". He also planned to scrap the High Speed 2 rail project and increase school funding by £1 billion.

By 5 June 2019, Johnson became the clear frontrunner with the bookmakers, with Gove second favourite, followed closely by Jeremy Hunt. In June, reports emerged that Gove had taken cocaine as a journalist in his twenties. Gove stated that he regretted having done so, and regarded it as having been a mistake. In an article for The Times in December 1999, Gove had argued against the legalisation of drugs and criticised members of the middle classes for their hypocrisy in doing so. This was a key component of his bid to be leader. In reaction, Craig Oliver said it would have a negative impact on his run whereas fellow candidate for leadership Dominic Raab said he "admires [Gove's] honesty".

Gove progressed following the first ballot, having received 37 votes. He received 41 votes in the second ballot, and by the third ballot had 51 MPs backing him. The fourth ballot saw him gain 61 votes, moving him into second position. In the last ballot, he had 75 votes and was voted out – losing by only two to Hunt, the eventual runner-up.

Chancellor of the Duchy of Lancaster (2019–2021)

Upon the election of Johnson as Prime Minister, Gove was appointed Chancellor of the Duchy of Lancaster, legally representing the Crown as Duke of Lancaster. His otherwise non-portfolio role included responsibility for no-deal Brexit preparations, overseeing constitutional affairs, maintaining the integrity of the Union and having oversight over all Cabinet Office policy. Gove was excluded from a place on the National Security Council committee as Johnson pursued a slimming down of Cabinet operations. He became a central figure in the conduction of Operation Yellowhammer, the civil contingency planning for the possibility of a no-deal Brexit.

Writing in The Sunday Times on 28 July 2019, Gove said that a no-deal Brexit was "a very real prospect" and one that the Government was "working on the assumption of". He said in August that it was "wrong and sad" that the EU was "refusing to negotiate" over a new withdrawal agreement. That month, an official Cabinet Yellowhammer document leaked, predicting that a no-deal Brexit would lead to food, medicine and petrol shortages. Gove said the leaked dossier outlined a "worst-case scenario". Interviewed in September 2019, Gove declined to say whether the Government would abide by legislation designed to stop a no-deal Brexit.

During the 2019 Speaker of the House of Commons election, Gove nominated Labour MP Chris Bryant to replace John Bercow.

Gove helped to prepare Johnson for the 2019 general election debates by playing the role of the Labour leader Jeremy Corbyn. He offered to stand in for Johnson during a Channel 4 debate on environmental issues but the editor of Channel 4 News said the debate was only open to party leaders.

On 13 February 2020, Gove took on additional responsibilities as Minister for the Cabinet Office, succeeding Oliver Dowden, who had been appointed Secretary of State for Digital, Culture, Media and Sport, in Johnson's first large reshuffle of his government.

During the first COVID-19 pandemic lockdown, Gove generated confusion after saying on ITV's Good Morning Britain that children with separated parents were not allowed to move between their parents' homes. He later apologised and clarified that what he had said was not the case. When Johnson was self-isolating after having been tested positive for COVID-19, Gove stood in for Johnson briefly from 27 March 2020 at the daily briefings of the pandemic, until Gove self-isolated himself after a family member developed COVID-19 symptoms.

In May 2020, Gove was criticised after his wife Sarah Vine shared a bookcase picture "as a very special treat for my trolls" which featured a book by the Holocaust denier David Irving, and a copy of The Bell Curve, which controversially claims that intelligence is highly heritable and that median IQ varies among races. Another book in the photograph was The Strange Death of Europe by Douglas Murray, which, according to The Guardian, cites Enoch Powell and argues for protecting white Christian Europe from "outsiders".

After Johnson said that the UK had ended trade talks with the EU in October 2020, Gove said that the door was "still ajar" if the EU made changes over issues including fishing access and that "We hope the EU will change their position and we are certainly not saying if they do change their position we can't talk to them".

Gove was part of a committee of Cabinet ministers, comprising Johnson, Rishi Sunak and Matt Hancock, that made decisions on the COVID-19 pandemic. He was chair of the COVID-19 operations subcommittee. In a COBR meeting he chaired on 24 November 2020, he agreed, with the leaders of the UK's devolved governments, to a set of rules governing social mixing for the whole of the country over the Christmas period. It allowed for up to three households to form a "bubble" from 23 to 27 December, but was cancelled for London and South East England, while being limited to a single day for the rest of England, after the discovery of a mutant COVID-19 strain.

Under the terms of England's all-tier COVID-19 restrictions in December 2020, pubs were only legally allowed to serve alcoholic beverages with a substantial meal. Gove initially said that this did not include Scotch eggs, which he defined as a "starter" on multiple occasions (although he said it "would count as a substantial meal if there were table service"); however, he later backtracked and said: "I do recognise that it is a substantial meal."

Gove was co-chair of the EU–UK Partnership Council with European Commission vice-president Maroš Šefčovič. On 8 December 2020, after 10 months of talks with Šefčovič, he helped reach an agreement that included post-Brexit arrangements for the Irish border. As a consequence the Government decided to abandon parts of the Internal Market Bill that could have seen the UK break international law. David Frost succeeded Gove as the UK chair of the Partnership Council on 1 March 2021.

In May 2021, Gove attended the 2021 Champions League Final in Porto with his son, supporting Chelsea; following his visit he was alerted by the NHS Test and Trace system of his potential exposure to the disease, and that he would need to self-isolate. Rather than isolating for the normal ten-day period, Gove was able to take part in a pilot scheme designed to investigate the efficacy of testing, which required him to self-isolate for only one day and undergo testing every day for a week.

In a case brought to the High Court of Justice by the Good Law Project in June 2021, Gove was found to have acted unlawfully when the Government awarded a COVID-19 contract without a tender to a polling company owned by long-term associates of his and Dominic Cummings, then Johnson's chief adviser.

In July 2021, Gove worked part-time in Glasgow as part of the Government strategy to strengthen the Union.

Secretary of State for Levelling Up, Housing and Communities (2021–2022)
In a cabinet reshuffle on 15 September 2021, Gove was appointed Secretary of State for Housing, Communities and Local Government. He was given responsibilities for the Government's levelling up agenda, the Union and elections, the last two of which he retained from his previous post. Within days his department was renamed the Department for Levelling Up, Housing and Communities, and his title changed to Secretary of State for Levelling Up, Housing and Communities. He was given the additional title of Minister for Intergovernmental Relations.

In October 2021, while walking on Horseferry Road in Westminster, Gove was accosted by COVID-19 anti-lockdown protesters. As the protesters attempted to surround him, he was protected by police officers and escorted to a nearby building.

In December 2021, Gove was part of a trio of Cabinet ministers that self-isolated after meeting Australian Deputy Prime Minister Barnaby Joyce, who was later diagnosed with COVID-19.

Gove launched a white paper on levelling up on 2 February 2022. The paper included plans to increase public investment across the UK and expand devolution in England. It was reported that parts of it had been copied from Wikipedia.

During the Russian invasion of Ukraine, Gove announced his intention to draft plans to allow Ukrainian refugees to be housed in Russian oligarchs' homes in the UK. He later announced the Homes for Ukraine scheme, which would arrange for British households to take in Ukrainian refugees.
	
Gove attended the 2022 Bilderberg meeting in Washington, D.C.

The Telegraph journalist Matthew Lynn attacked Gove's record in government, describing him as the "driving force behind a whole series of terrible policy mistakes". In particular, Lynn identified Gove's resistance to new skyscrapers in London, his changes to the rules concerning the rental sector to make it harder for landlords to evict tenants, and his opposition to a fracking trial as damaging the economic growth prospects for the UK.

On 6 July 2022, Gove was dismissed by Johnson for alleged disloyalty, after visiting Downing Street to tell him to resign, during the July 2022 Government crisis. A Downing Street source described him as a "snake" following the sacking.

Backbencher (2022)
Gove declined to run in the July–September 2022 Conservative Party leadership election. He endorsed Kemi Badenoch's leadership bid and, after her defeat, announced his support for Rishi Sunak. 

Following the election of Liz Truss, Gove variously backed and criticised the prime minister on Chancellor of the Exchequer Kwasi Kwarteng's controversial reforms to taxation. According to journalist Harry Cole, Truss offered Gove the posts of British Ambassador to Israel and British Ambassador to China.

Gove declined to run in the October 2022 Conservative Party leadership election. He endorsed Sunak's leadership bid.

Secretary of State for Levelling Up, Housing and Communities (2022–present)

On 25 October 2022, following the accession of Rishi Sunak to the prime ministership, Gove was reinstated to his previous roles of Secretary of State for Levelling Up, Housing and Communities and Minister for Intergovernmental Relations. The appointment was reported as a surprise, as Gove had previously said that he did not expect to serve in government again.

According to The Times, in the 2023 cabinet reshuffle, Sunak wanted Gove to become Secretary of State for Science, Innovation and Technology, but Gove asked to stay at the levelling up department.

In February 2023, following the death of Awaab Ishak, a two-year old child living in a mould-hit flat, the Government announced that it would implement "Awaab's Law", which will require social housing providers to remedy reported damp and mould within certain time limits. Gove made the announcement as he met with Awaab's family in Rochdale.

Political stances
Gove is generally considered as combining socially liberal views—for example, on gay marriage—with a harder Eurosceptic and neoconservative position on foreign affairs. He has expressed his view that the state should generally not interfere in domestic affairs and attests to have campaigned for economic freedom in certain matters. Gove has argued that "the only sustainable ethical foundation for society is a belief in the innate worth and dignity of every individual."

Giving evidence before the Leveson Inquiry in May 2012, Gove said he was "unashamedly on the side of those who say that we should think very carefully before legislation and regulation because the cry 'Something must be done' often leads to people doing something which isn't always wise."

During the 2008 Conservative Party Conference, Gove argued that Edmund Burke, an 18th-century philosopher who commented on organic society and the French Revolution, was the greatest conservative ever. When asked about those who believe "Marx was right all along", he responded that they were guilty of ignoring the systematic abuses and poverty of centrally planned economies, and criticised the historian Eric Hobsbawm, saying that "only when Hobsbawm weeps hot tears for a life spent serving an ideology of wickedness will he ever be worth listening to."

In remarks prepared for the 2020 Ditchley Lecture, Gove portrayed what he saw as the malaise of modern society as leading to populism, because the non-intellectual classes "chose to opt for polarised identity politics rather than stay with broad-based national political movements" instead of choosing to follow the politics of diversity, inclusion and identity politics they were force-fed by the elites. He praised Franklin D. Roosevelt as a model for his renewal of capitalism and he imagined the construction of inclusive societies with the deconstruction of Whitehall. Gove stressed "basic writing, meeting chairing and time management skills" for all policy civil servants. He ended with a paean to his purpose in public service: "to tackle inequality".

Capital punishment
In 1997, Gove wrote of capital punishment, which was abolished in the UK in 1965, arguing in The Times that, "Were I ever alone in the dock I would not want to be arraigned before our flawed tribunals, knowing my freedom could be forfeited as a result of political pressures. I would prefer a fair trial, under the shadow of the noose." The Independent reported in 2015 that Gove had not appeared to repeat his backing for the death penalty since he made the remarks in the late 1990s.

Foreign policy
The Financial Times describes Gove as having "strong neoconservative convictions".

In 2003, he stated that he did not believe the United States' "current position in the world [was] analogous to that of an Imperial power, as we have come to understand imperial powers".

William Dalrymple, reviewing Gove's book Celsius 7/7 on the roots of Islamic terrorism in The Times, dismissed Gove's knowledge of the Middle East as being derivative and based on the views of Bernard Lewis.

Iraq
In February 2003, Gove expressed admiration for New Labour Prime Minister Tony Blair because of the way he was handling the crisis in Iraq: "As a right-wing polemicist, all I can say looking at Mr Blair now is, what's not to like?" Blair, he thought, was "behaving like a true Thatcherite". In December 2008, Gove wrote that declarations of either victory or defeat in Iraq in 2003 were premature, and that the liberation of Iraq was a foreign policy success.

Tariq Ali once recalled how, at the time of the Iraq War, he "debat[ed] the ghastly Gove on television [... and found him] worse than most Bush apologists in the United States."

Intervention in Syria
Gove had to be calmed by parliamentary colleagues in August 2013 after shouting, "A disgrace, you're a disgrace!" at various Conservative and Liberal Democrat rebels who contributed to defeating the coalition government's motion to attack Syria in retaliation for the 2013 Ghouta attacks. He later stated he was reacting to the manner in which Labour MPs celebrated the outcome of the vote.

Saudi Arabian prisons
In 2015, Gove cancelled a £5.9 million contract to provide services for prisons in Saudi Arabia, according to The Guardian, because it was thought "the British government should not be assisting a regime that uses beheadings, stoning, crucifixions and lashings as forms of punishment." Foreign Secretary Philip Hammond was reported to have accused Gove of being naive.

Health
Gove is one of several Conservative MPs who co-authored Direct Democracy: An Agenda for a New Model Party (2005). The book says the NHS "fails to meet public expectations" and calls for it to be dismantled and replaced with personal health accounts. Gove fractured his foot in July 2015. His wife Sarah Vine (somewhat inaccurately) complained in her Daily Mail column that he could not have his foot X-rayed by the NHS because the minor injuries unit the couple visited did not provide the facility at weekends.

Scottish independence
Gove believes that Scotland should remain part of the United Kingdom, arguing that Scotland's strengths complement those of other parts of the UK. He has expressed interest in the idea of letting Scottish people living in the other regions of the UK vote in a second Scottish independence referendum.

Israel and Jewish people
Gove has described himself as "a proud Zionist", and supports the United Jewish Israel Appeal's fundraising activities. In 2019, he reiterated "One thing I have always been since I was a boy is a Zionist" and spoke of his desire to "celebrate everything that Israel and the Jewish people have brought to the life of this world and hold it dear to our hearts" and that "For as long as I have breath in my body and a platform on which to argue I shall be on your side, by your side and delighted and honoured to argue, powerfully I hope, on behalf of people who have contributed so powerfully to the life of this nation".

Gove is, like the great majority of UK Conservative Party MPs, a member of Conservative Friends of Israel. He has said that the Boycott, Divestment and Sanctions movement against Israel is anti-Semitic. Gove said that jihadist terrorists "hate Israel, and they wish to wipe out the Jewish people's home, not because of what Israel does but because of what Israel is – free, democratic, liberal and western."

First World War
In an article about the First World War centenary in January 2014, Gove criticised academic and television interpretations of World War I as "left-wing versions of the past designed to belittle Britain and its leaders."

Some of Gove's key points were rebuffed by the academics that Gove had used to support his thesis. Gove had criticised Cambridge professor Sir Richard Evans saying his views were more like that of an undergraduate cynic in a Footlights review. Instead he urged people to listen to Margaret MacMillan of Oxford University. MacMillan responded, saying: "I agree with some of what Mr Gove says, but he is mistaking myths for rival interpretations of history. I did not say, as Mr Gove suggests, that British soldiers in the First World War were consciously fighting for a western liberal order. They were just defending their homeland and fighting what they saw as German militarism." Evans said Gove's attack was "ignorant" and asked how anyone could possibly say Britons were fighting for freedom given their country's main ally was Tsarist Russia. Jeremy Paxman said Gove had "wilfully misquoted" Evans on the subject of the First World War.

Religion
In 2012, Gove was behind plans to provide schools throughout England and Wales with a copy of the King James Bible (inscribed "presented by the Secretary of State for Education") to celebrate the 400th anniversary of its translation into English, though he said he backed the scheme because of the historical and cultural significance of that translation rather than on purely religious grounds.

In 2013, Gove credited Cardinal Keith O'Brien with using his intellect to protect the vulnerable in Scotland whilst regretting the absence of a similar figure in the Kirk.

In April 2015, he described his faith in an article for The Spectator. In widely reported remarks, he complained that "to call yourself a Christian in contemporary Britain is to invite pity, condescension or cool dismissal."

In 2016, he credited his Christian faith for his focus as Justice Secretary on redemption and rehabilitation.

Other views
Gove's proposal for a new Royal Yacht costing £60 million was made public in January 2012. Deputy Prime Minister Nick Clegg criticised the idea, calling it "a case of the haves and the have yachts".

In March 2014, he described the concentration of Old Etonians at the top of the Conservative coalition as "ridiculous. I don't know where you can find a similar situation in any other developed economy."

In popular culture
Gove was a member of the winning team in Grampian Television's quiz show Top Club, and played the school chaplain in the 1995 family comedy A Feast at Midnight.

Gove was portrayed by actor Oliver Maltman in the 2019 HBO and Channel 4 drama Brexit: The Uncivil War.

In the 2020 revival of Spitting Image, Gove's puppet was given "beady eyes, large ears and bulging cheeks". He was voiced by Lewis MacLeod.

Personal life
Gove met the journalist Sarah Vine in 1998, when he was comment editor and she was arts editor at The Times. They married in October 2001 and have two children—a daughter born in 2003 and a son born in 2004. Gove has lived in Earl's Court, Notting Hill, North Kensington and Mayfair. In July 2021, a joint statement on behalf of Gove and Vine said that they had agreed to separate and were in the process of finalising their divorce. Following the separation, Gove lived in an official ministerial residence on Carlton Gardens, St James's. In January 2022, their divorce was granted.

Gove contracted H1N1 swine flu during the 2009 influenza pandemic.

Gove is a supporter of Queens Park Rangers Football Club.

In August 2021, Gove was filmed dancing "merrily" in an Aberdeen nightclub. He had allegedly tried to avoid a £5 entrance fee by stating he was the chancellor of the Duchy of Lancaster. Friends of Gove denied he had attempted to avoid paying.

Honours
 13 May 2010: Appointed to the Privy Council of the United Kingdom, giving him the honorific title "The Right Honourable" for life.

Awards
Gove won the "Rising Star Award" at the February 2006 Channel 4 political awards, the "Minister of the Year" award at the 2011 Spectator awards, and the "Minister to watch" award at the January 2020 Spectator Parliamentarian of the Year awards.

In 2019, LBC's Iain Dale and a "panel of experts" placed Gove third in a list of that year's "Top 100 Most Influential Conservatives".

Bibliography

Michael Portillo: The Future of the Right (London: Fourth Estate, 1995)
The Price of Peace: an analysis of British policy in Northern Ireland  (London: Centre for Policy Studies, 2000)
Celsius 7/7 (London: Weidenfeld & Nicolson, 2006)
A Blue Tomorrow: New Visions for Modern Conservatives (London: Politico's, 2001; ed. with Edward Vaizey and Nicholas Boles)

Notes

References

Footnotes

Sources

External links

 
 
 Profile at the Conservative Party
 John Rentoul, "The Independent names Michael Gove as a top public service innovator", Ethosjournal.com, June 2012.
 Column archives, Timesonline.co.uk. Accessed 24 December 2022.
 Profile, economist.com. Accessed 24 December 2022.
 

1967 births
Living people
20th-century British journalists
21st-century British journalists
Alumni of Lady Margaret Hall, Oxford
BBC newsreaders and journalists
British Christian Zionists
British Christians
British Secretaries of State for Education
British Secretaries of State for the Environment
Chancellors of the Duchy of Lancaster
Conservative Party (UK) MPs for English constituencies
Daily Mail journalists
Lord chancellors of Great Britain
Members of the Privy Council of the United Kingdom
People educated at Robert Gordon's College
Politicians from Aberdeen
Politicians from Edinburgh
Presidents of the Oxford Union
Scottish adoptees
Scottish columnists
Scottish journalists
Secretaries of State for Justice (UK)
The Times people
UK MPs 2005–2010
UK MPs 2010–2015
UK MPs 2015–2017
UK MPs 2017–2019
UK MPs 2019–present
British Eurosceptics